Norma Leticia Orozco Torres (born 5 January 1953) is a Mexican politician from the New Alliance Party (formerly from the Ecologist Green Party of Mexico). From 2009 to 2012 she served as Deputy of the LXI Legislature of the Mexican Congress representing Guanajuato.

References

1953 births
Living people
Politicians from Guanajuato
Women members of the Chamber of Deputies (Mexico)
Ecologist Green Party of Mexico politicians
New Alliance Party (Mexico) politicians
21st-century Mexican politicians
21st-century Mexican women politicians
Deputies of the LXI Legislature of Mexico
Members of the Chamber of Deputies (Mexico) for Guanajuato